Circus Time was a variety program presented in the United States by television network ABC on Thursday evenings from October 4, 1956 to June 27, 1957.

Circus Time was not an actual circus broadcast but rather a circus-themed program, in which both traditional circus acts and more traditional mainstream forms of entertainment were presented.  The host, or "ringmaster" in the show's parlance, was ventriloquist Paul Winchell, who was "assisted" by his dummies Jerry Mahoney and Knucklehead Smiff. Mainstream musical guests appearing on the program at times included The Diamonds, Mickey and Sylvia and the Dell Vikings.

References

 Brooks, Tim and Marsh, Earle, The Complete Directory to Prime Time Network and Cable TV Shows

1956 American television series debuts
1957 American television series endings
1950s American variety television series
American Broadcasting Company original programming
Circuses
Circus television shows